Pomona High School, Former, also known as Lindley Junior High School, is a historic school building located at Greensboro, Guilford County, North Carolina. The original section was built about 1920, and is a two-story, nine bay, "U"-shaped, Classical Revival style building.  Two projecting wings were added in 1940, and in 1951, the space was filled between the wings. It is faced with dark bricks accented with limestone, concrete, and terra cotta ornament.  The building features a one-story limestone entrance portico supported by four Doric order columns.  The school closed in 1979. It has been converted to apartments.

It was listed on the National Register of Historic Places in 1992.

References

High schools in North Carolina
School buildings on the National Register of Historic Places in North Carolina
Neoclassical architecture in North Carolina
School buildings completed in 1920
Schools in Greensboro, North Carolina
National Register of Historic Places in Guilford County, North Carolina
1920 establishments in North Carolina